Cyrtomoscelis is a genus of beetles in the family Carabidae, containing the following species:

 Cyrtomoscelis abacetoides (Straneo, 1958)
 Cyrtomoscelis ambigua (Straneo, 1965)
 Cyrtomoscelis bangenia Straneo, 1995
 Cyrtomoscelis caffra (Peringuey, 1926)
 Cyrtomoscelis dwesana Straneo, 1991
 Cyrtomoscelis elongata (Straneo, 1939)
 Cyrtomoscelis ferruginea (Boheman, 1848)
 Cyrtomoscelis ferruginoides (Straneo, 1938)
 Cyrtomoscelis humicola (Straneo, 1965)
 Cyrtomoscelis inflata (Straneo, 1958)
 Cyrtomoscelis leonardii Straneo, 1991
 Cyrtomoscelis longistria Straneo, 1986
 Cyrtomoscelis major (Straneo, 1939)
 Cyrtomoscelis minima (Straneo, 1947)
 Cyrtomoscelis natalensis Chaudoir, 1874
 Cyrtomoscelis ovalipennis Straneo, 1991
 Cyrtomoscelis pauper (Straneo, 1965)
 Cyrtomoscelis piriensis (Straneo, 1965)
 Cyrtomoscelis rotundicollis (Straneo, 1965)
 Cyrtomoscelis silvicola Straneo, 1991
 Cyrtomoscelis trivialis (Boheman, 1848)

References

Pterostichinae